Carl Goetz (10 April 1862 – 15 August 1932) was an Austrian stage and film actor. He appeared in around seventy films during the silent and early sound eras. Goetz was of a Jewish background. He is particularly noted for his role in Georg Wilhelm Pabst's Pandora's Box (1929).

Selected filmography
 Bogdan Stimoff (1916)
 Tom Sawyer (1917)
 The Count of Cagliostro (1920)
 The Fool and Death (1920)
 Dracula's Death (1921)
 The Favourite of the Queen (1922)
 La Boheme (1923)
 The Expulsion (1923)
 The Mill at Sanssouci (1926)
 The Bank Crash of Unter den Linden (1926)
 Pratermizzi (1927)
 Princess Olala (1928)
 Scampolo (1928)
 My Heart is a Jazz Band (1929)
 Pandora's Box (1929)
 Fräulein Else (1929)
 The Singing City (1930)
 The Flute Concert of Sanssouci (1930)
 Danton (1931)
 Yorck (1931)
 The Paw (1931)
 1914 (1931)
 Shadows of the Underworld (1931)
 The Woman They Talk About (1931)

References

Bibliography
 Prawer, S.S. Between Two Worlds: The Jewish Presence in German and Austrian Film, 1910-1933. Berghahn Books, 2005.

External links

1862 births
1932 deaths
Austrian Jews
Austrian male stage actors
Austrian male film actors
Austrian male silent film actors
Male actors from Vienna
20th-century Austrian male actors